A tourist tax is any revenue-generating measure targeted at tourists. It is a means of combating overtourism and a form of tax exporting (partial shifting of tax burden to non-citizens or non-residents). The tourist industry typically campaigns against the taxes. It is separate from value-added tax and other taxes that tourists may pay, but are also paid by residents.

Types

Per diem tax
As of 2019, Bhutan charges $200 to $250 per visitor per day, considered one of the highest tourist taxes at the time. Originally people from India, Bangladesh, and the Maldives were exempt from part of the fee, but the country plans to increase fees for these visitors beginning in 2020.

Hotel tax

Many countries in Europe charge a per-day tax on rooms in hotels and other temporary accommodation. In Germany, the tax is levied by cities in addition to VAT and is called  or "Bettensteuer" (bed tax). In many municipalities business travelers are exempt from paying it. Spanish municipalities also charge local hotel tax of a few euros flat fee. In Greece the hotel tax, charged from 2018, ranges from 0.50 euros to 4 euros. Romania, in addition to other tourist taxes, charges 1% of the price of the accommodation nationally. Many US states and municipalities charge hotel tax. The highest rate is Houston at 17% of the cost of lodging daily.

In the Netherlands, cruising tax is also charged for people staying in cruise ships docked in the city, while separate taxes target people staying in hotels.

Restaurant tax
Taxes on restaurants can also be considered a form of tourist tax.

Arrival tax
In 2019, New Zealand was planning to institute a $35 arrival tax for visitors from countries beyond the Pacific region. It was estimated to raise NZ$80 million annually and reduce the number of visitors by 20,000 annually. Venice introduced a 10-euro entrance fee in 2018, and Civita di Bagnoregio charges a 5-euro entry fee as of 2019.

Departure tax

Most Caribbean countries charge a departure tax (in 2019, it was $51 in Antigua and Barbuda, and $15 in Bahamas) which is automatically added to airline fares. As of 2019, Japan charged a 1,000-yen "sayonara tax" to visitors leaving the country. Proceeds were used to fund the 2020 Summer Olympics, which were scheduled to be held in Tokyo. Indonesia charges a departure tax, but it differs depending on the airport.

References

International taxation
Tourism